Parvez Dewan is an Indian administrator, author and librettist (lyricist). He is an Indian Administrative Services (IAS) officer of Jammu and Kashmir cadre. He became Secretary of the Ministry of Overseas Indian Affairs in 2011, and also the chairman of the Overseas Indian Facilitation Centre (OIFC). In 2012 he was appointed India's Tourism Secretary.

Dewan has authored books on Jammu & Kashmir, religion (Hinduism, Islam, Buddhism) as well as on Tibet.

Early life 
Parvez Dewan was born on 13 October 1972  in Srinagar. His father was a Wing Commander who began his career in the Royal Air Force and grandfather an Army Brigadier, who later became the first Indian Inspector General of Police of Jammu and Kashmir.

Dewan was educated at St Joseph's, Allahabad; St. George's Grammar, Hyderabad; Stanes, Coimbatore; The Air Force Central School, Subroto Park, New Delhi and St. Stephen's College in Delhi. He was elected President of St. Stephen's College. He received his higher education at Wolfson College, University of Cambridge. Dewan was the Senior Treasurer of the CU (Cambridge University) Friends of the Earth; and active with the CU Greens and CU Mystical Society.

Dewan was later elected a visiting research fellow of Queen Elizabeth House at the University of Oxford. At Cambridge, he won the Jennings Prize  for obtaining the highest marks, as well as a distinction, in the Development Studies class. At St. Stephen's he was awarded the L. Raghubir Singh History prize for ranking first in his class.

Career

Civil services
Dewan joined the IAS  and was allotted the Jammu and Kashmir cadre.

During his first posting as Sub-Divisional Magistrate in Basohli, he revived its school of miniature painting.

Dewan was the Divisional commissioner of Kashmir from 2001 to 2003. and also chairman of the state co-operative bank between 2002 – 2003. Dewan was also the resident commissioner of Jammu & Kashmir before he took charge as the chairman and managing director of India Tourism Development Corporation in 2006. The company recorded its three highest-ever profits under him, and declared the only three dividends that it has since 1997.

Dewan was the Tourism Secretary of India (2012–14). He helped WoNoBo.com devise virtual walking tours of Indian cities, five in the first place, with almost fifty more to follow, making Incredible India the first national tourism authority anywhere to offer such a useful and entertaining facility.

In October 2014 Dewan asked for and was granted voluntary, premature retirement, in order to concentrate on his career as a writer, especially to work on his South Asian encyclopaedia, Indpaedia.com.

Advisor (minister)

In 2016 Dewan was appointed Jammu and Kashmir's Advisor (i.e. cabinet minister) for twelve departments including Education, Tourism, Public Works, Culture, Health & Medical Education, Consumer Affairs, Information Technology, Youth Services and Sports. (In India ministers are elected politicians. However, sometimes when state governments are between elected governments they appoint career civil servants as ministers and call them Advisors to the Governor.)

Writer 
Dewan translated the Hanuman Chalisa into English, written The Names of Allah, and brought out Jesus Christ Superstar in Urdu. He has also converted Habba Khatun's songs into Urdu songs, set to the same tune.

Dewan is also the co-author of Tibet: fifty years after with Siddharth Shrivastava. Dalai Lama has written the foreword to this book. In the foreword, HE the Dalai lama advocates peace for Tibet and China, and states that violence is counter-productive and creates misery. Dewan and Shrivastava visited Tibet after the 2008 failed uprising of Tibetans against the Chinese rule, & documented the population figures and the socio-political situation in the region.

Dewan has researched into various caste and religious groups in India. He has focused on the biased projections that the media has created for minority religious and ethnic groups within the country—and tried to compare them with similar prejudices against internal ethnic groups in Pakistan (Punjabi and Urdu cinema; textbooks), the USA (including US cinema and TV), the UK, Turkey, Indonesia, Europe (French cinema; permission to wear religion-appropriate clothing) and Africa.

Books 
Dewan has published twenty books till date, some of which are listed in the table below

Journalism 
As a college student Dewan was for three years the Campus Correspondent of The Hindustan Times Evening News. During the same period, for Youth Times [a Times of India publication] he reviewed music (mainly Western popular and classical) and did the Hodge Podge column under the pseudonym Ponga Muni.

Indian Express wrote about Dewan:

Parvez Dewan seems to have that rare quality to poke fun at himself. On the author’s profile page of his latest book on Kashmir, this J&K IAS officer has candidly revealed some interesting facts about himself. “Most of the publications that Parvez has written for have folded up (Youth Times, JS, The Hindustan Times Evening News, The Metropolitan on Saturday, Shama (Urdu) and such sections of The Times of India as he regularly contributed to)”, it mentions. “The venerable Illustrated Weekly of India wrote a long story about how Parvez created the Ladakh Festival in difficult circumstances. That was its last issue,” it carries on.

At another point, it talks about two of his ‘libretti’ having been recorded as rock operas in Denmark, and a third telecast on Britain’s Channel Four, adding: "And none of the three was ever heard of again."

A fourth pop-opera, Sanober and the Slave has had somewhat better luck. In 2012 it spent more than three months at no. 1 on reverbnation.com's DK charts for Indie (Independent), thanks to the much acclaimed music of Kim Barner, his Danish partner in rhyme. The complete lyrics/ libretto/ book can be read at http://sanoberandtheslave.blogspot.com/; the complete musical with music and vocals can be heard at reverbnation.com/barner

Libretti/ lyrics 
Dewan has written some libretti.  The status of the pop-operas of which he has written the libretti (lyrics) and which were conceived by him is.

References

External links 

 Parvez Dewan at Penguin India

1972 births
Indian Administrative Service officers
Writers from Jammu and Kashmir
St. Stephen's College, Delhi alumni
Alumni of the University of Oxford
Alumni of the University of Cambridge
Living people
Indian travel writers
Indian lyricists